Ivan Todorović (Serbian Cyrillic: Иван Тодоровић; born 29 July 1983) is a Serbian professional footballer who plays as a central midfielder.

Todorović represented Serbia and Montenegro at the 2006 UEFA Under-21 Championship.

Honours
Čukarički
 Serbian Cup: 2014–15

Notes

External links
 
 
 

Association football midfielders
C.D. Nacional players
Expatriate footballers in Portugal
Expatriate footballers in Russia
FC KAMAZ Naberezhnye Chelny players
FC Rotor Volgograd players
First League of Serbia and Montenegro players
FK Borac Čačak players
FK Čukarički players
FK Hajduk Beograd players
FK Novi Pazar players
FK Zeta players
Primeira Liga players
Serbia and Montenegro under-21 international footballers
Serbian expatriate footballers
Serbian expatriate sportspeople in Portugal
Serbian expatriate sportspeople in Russia
Serbian footballers
Serbian SuperLiga players
Footballers from Belgrade
1983 births
Living people